The angle of His, also known as the esophagogastric angle, is the acute angle created between the cardia at the entrance to the stomach, and the esophagus. It helps to prevent acid reflux of stomach acid into the esophagus. It is commonly undeveloped in infants, making acid reflux more common.

Structure 
The angle of His is the acute angle between the stomach and the esophagus. It is created by the collar sling fibres and the circular muscles around this gastroesophageal junction.

Variation 
The angle of His is normally undeveloped in infants, with the esophagus making a vertical junction with the stomach. As a result, reflux of stomach contents is common.

Function 
The angle of His forms an anatomical sphincter. This prevents the reflux of stomach acid, digestive enzymes, and duodenal bile from entering the esophagus. This is important in preventing gastroesophageal reflux disease and inflammation of the esophagus.

History 
The angle of His is also known as the esophagogastric angle.

References

Digestive system